Sacrifice is a 1917 American drama silent film directed by Frank Reicher and written by Charles Kenyon, Beatrice DeMille and Leighton Osmun. The film stars Margaret Illington, Jack Holt, Noah Beery, Sr. and Winter Hall. The film was released on May 3, 1917, by Paramount Pictures.

Plot

Cast 
Margaret Illington as Mary Stephen / Vesta BVoris
Jack Holt as Paul Ekald
Winter Hall as Stephen Stephani
Noah Beery, Sr. as Count Wenzel

References

External links 
 
 l newspaper-Paramount add for the film

1917 films
1910s English-language films
Silent American drama films
1917 drama films
Paramount Pictures films
American black-and-white films
American silent feature films
Films set in Europe
Films directed by Frank Reicher
1910s American films